Hossein Mahini (born September 16, 1986) is an Iranian footballer who played for the Persian Gulf Pro League side Saipa and the Iran national football team as a defender.

Club career

Persepolis

On 7 July 2012, he signed a two-year contract with the leading Tehran team, Persepolis. Mahini is known for his speed and crossing. On 2 May 2014, Mahini extended his contract with Persepolis until 2017. However, he agreed to a loan move to Malavan on 20 October 2014 to spend his conscription service, effective from 1 January 2015.

He returned to Persepolis in May 2016 after completing his service at Malavan.

On 13 January 2020, Mahini left Persepolis after 7 years playing for the team.

International career
He was recruited to the Iran national football team by Carlos Queiroz for the first time. Previously, Mahini was an Iran national under-23 football team player and won a bronze medal at 2006 Asian Games. On 1 June 2014, he was brought into Iran's 2014 FIFA World Cup squad by Queiroz. He was an unused substitute in the tournament, in which Iran was eliminated in the group stages.

Arrest
Mahini was arrested on September 29, 2022 by Islamic Republic security forces for voicing solidarity and support with the Iranian people during the September 2022 Iranian protests on social media. Fellow footballers such as Ali Karimi, Mehdi Mahdavikia, Mohammad Taghavi, Voria Ghafouri and Aref Gholami reacted to his arrest and expressed their support on social media.

Club career statistics 
 As of 17 February 2020

Honours

Club
Zob Ahan
 AFC Champions League runner-up: 2010

Persepolis
Persian Gulf Pro League (3): 2016–17, 2017–18, 2018–19
Hazfi Cup (1): 2018–19
Iranian Super Cup (3): 2017, 2018, 2019
AFC Champions League runner-up: 2018

National
Iran U23
Asian Games Bronze Medal: 2006

References

External links

Hossein Mahini  at PersianLeague.com
Hossein Mahini at TeamMelli.com

1986 births
Living people
Iranian footballers
Persian Gulf Pro League players
Persepolis F.C. players
Nassaji Mazandaran players
Esteghlal Ahvaz players
Zob Ahan Esfahan F.C. players
Asian Games bronze medalists for Iran
2014 FIFA World Cup players
People from Bushehr
Association football fullbacks
Asian Games medalists in football
Footballers at the 2006 Asian Games
Medalists at the 2006 Asian Games
Iran international footballers
Mahsa Amini protests
21st-century Iranian people